This was the first edition of the tournament.

Nikola Milojević won the title after defeating Dimitar Kuzmanov 2–6, 6–2, 7–6(7–5) in the final.

Seeds

Draw

Finals

Top half

Bottom half

References

External links
Main draw
Qualifying draw

Zadar Open - 1